Vindel may refer to:

Vindel, Cuenca, municipality in Cuenca, Spain
Vindel River, river in Sweden
Damián Vindel (born 1981), Spanish sprint canoeist
Lorena Vindel (born 1977), Honduran actress and artist